Acrobasis romanella is a species of snout moth in the genus Acrobasis. It was described by Pierre Millière, in 1870. It is found in France, Spain, Portugal and Italy.

References

Moths described in 1870
Acrobasis
Moths of Europe